Weißenborn may refer to the following places in Germany:

Weißenborn, Saxony-Anhalt, in the Burgenlandkreis, Saxony-Anhalt
Weißenborn, Hesse, in the Werra-Meißner-Kreis, Hesse
Weißenborn (Gleichen), part of the municipality Gleichen in the Göttingen district, Lower Saxony
Weißenborn, Thuringia, in the Saale-Holzland-Kreis, Thuringia
Weißenborn, Saxony, in the Freiberg district, Saxony
Weißenborn (Zwickau), a locality of Zwickau, Saxony
Weißenborn-Lüderode, in the Eichsfeld district, Thuringia